This is a list of museums, galleries, or studios devoted or dedicated to a single photographer, or a single pair of photographers. (Many of them host exhibitions of the work of other photographers.)

Canada
Notman, William (1826–1891) – Notman Photographic Archives (Montréal, Québec)

Czech Republic
Sudek, Josef (1896–1976) – Josef Sudek Gallery (1995–; Prague)

Egypt
Nagy, Mohamed (1888–1956) – Mohamed Nagy Museum (1968–; Giza, Greater Cairo)

France
Cartier-Bresson, Henri (1908–2004) – Henri Cartier-Bresson Foundation (2003–; Paris)
Doisneau, Robert (1912–1994) – Maison de la photographie Robert Doisneau (1997–; Gentilly)
Franck, Martine (1938–2012) – Henri Cartier-Bresson Foundation (2003–; Paris)
Niépce, Nicéphore (1765–1833) – Nicéphore Niépce Museum (Chalon-sur-Saône)

Germany
Sander, August (1876–1964) – August Sander Archive (1992–; Cologne)

Japan
Domon Ken (1909–1990) – Ken Domon Museum of Photography (1983–; Sakata)
Irie Taikichi (1905–1992) – Irie Taikichi Memorial Museum of Photography Nara City (1992–; Nara)
Ueda Shōji (1913–2000) – Shoji Ueda Museum of Photography (1995–; Hōki, Tottori)

Mexico
Álvarez Bravo, Manuel (1902–2002) – Centro Fotográfico Manuel Álvarez Bravo (Oaxaca)

Turkey
Güler, Ara (1928–2018) – Ara Güler Museum (2018–; Istanbul)

United Kingdom
Cameron, Julia Margaret (1815–1879) – Dimbola Museum and Galleries (Freshwater, Isle of Wight)
Miller, Lee (1907–1977) – Farleys House (Chiddingly, East Sussex)

United States
Akerlund, Gust (1872–1954) – Cokato Museum & Gust Akerlund Studio (1986–; Cokato, Minnesota)
Austen, Alice (1866–1952) – Alice Austen House (1985–; Staten Island, New York)
Bennett, H. H. (1843–1908) – H. H. Bennett Studio (2000–; Wisconsin Dells, Wisconsin)
Link, O. Winston (1914–2001) – O. Winston Link Museum (2004–; Roanoke, Virginia)

Vietnam
Réhahn (b. 1979) – Precious Heritage Art Gallery Museum (2017–; Hoi An)

See also
 List of single-artist museums
 List of photographers

photographer
photographer